The Harbor Island National Wildlife Refuge is a  horseshoe-shaped island and National Wildlife Refuge in Potagannissing Bay north of Drummond Island in the U.S. state of Michigan.  The island was acquired in 1983 by the United States Fish and Wildlife Service from its previous owner, The Nature Conservancy, and set aside as a refuge. It is located in Drummond Township, in Chippewa County.

Ecology and use
Potagannissing Bay is rich in freshwater fish, including lake trout and whitefish.  The island itself contains balsam, paper birch, cedar, sugar maple, and red oak.

There are no bridges to Harbor Island, and visitors arrive by boat.  The protected harbor is a well-known anchorage for small craft.  The island and refuge are staffed from the Seney National Wildlife Refuge, also in northern Michigan.

References

External links
 

National Wildlife Refuges in Michigan
Protected areas of Chippewa County, Michigan
Protected areas established in 1983